Valerie Flake is a 1999 film directed by John Putch.

Lead actress Susan Traylor was nominated for the Independent Spirit Award for Best Female Lead for her performance.

Plot
A supermarket cashier in her early thirties must deal with the death of her husband.

Cast
 Susan Traylor – Valerie Flake
 Jay Underwood – Tim Darnell
 Christina Pickles – Meg Darnell
 Peter Michael Goetz – Douglas Flake
 Rosemary Forsyth – Irene Flake
 Terrence Howard – Hitchhiker (as Terrence Dashon Howard)
 Ann Gillespie – Barbara
 Sarah Bibb – Tammy
 Kevin Rahm – Jogger Ronald
 Richard Cummings Jr. – Rooftop Guard

References

External links

American independent films
1999 films
1990s English-language films
1999 drama films
American drama films
1990s American films
Films directed by John Putch